The 2010–11 NBA Development League season is the tenth season of the NBA Development League (NBA D-League). The NBA D-League is the official minor league basketball organization owned and run by the National Basketball Association (NBA). The league was formed in 2001 as the National Basketball Development League (NBDL). The league adopted the "NBA D-League" name in 2005 to reflect its close affiliation with the NBA (a name it retained until 2017, when it was renamed the NBA G League). One expansion franchise, the Texas Legends, joined the 15 returning teams from the previous season.

The season started with the 2010 NBA Development League Draft, which was held on November 1, 2010. Former NBA second-round draft pick Nick Fazekas was selected first overall by the Reno Bighorns. The regular season began on November 18, 2010, and ended on April 4, 2011. The Iowa Energy had the best regular season record with 37 wins and 13 losses. They also won the Eastern Conference, while the Reno Bighorns won the Western Conference with the second-best regular season record with 34 wins and 16 losses. The regular season set a new record on total attendance of 1,125,583, a 7.9% increase from the previous season.

The playoffs started on April 6, 2011. The first seed, the Iowa Energy, defeated the Utah Flash and the Tulsa 66ers in the first and second round consecutively. The defending champion Rio Grande Valley Vipers, who was seeded third, defeated the Bakersfield Jam and the Reno Bighorns in the first and second round respectively. The Energy and the Vipers face each other in the 2011 NBA D-League Finals that was started on April 24, 2011. The Energy won the first game 123–106, while the Vipers won the second game 141–122 to even the series. On April 29, 2011, the Energy won the decisive Game Three to win their first ever championship.

Teams and coaches

Team changes
The Texas Legends entered the D-League as an expansion franchise. The Legends was formed when an ownership group led by Donnie Nelson, the President of Basketball Operations and General Manager of the Dallas Mavericks, purchased the Colorado 14ers on June 18, 2009. The franchise relocated to Frisco, Texas and was renamed the Texas Legends.
On March 1, 2010, the Albuquerque Thundebirds announced that they would move from the Tingley Coliseum in Albuquerque, New Mexico to the Santa Ana Star Center in Rio Rancho, New Mexico. The team was also renamed the New Mexico Thunderbirds to reflect their new location and their statewide representation.
On May 21, 2010, the Los Angeles D-Fenders announced that they would not play in the 2010–11 season. The franchise, which is owned by the Los Angeles Lakers, relocated to El Segundo, California and will return to play in the 2011–12 season.

Affiliation changes
On July 6, 2010, the league announced the affiliation system for the season. The Austin Toros and the Tulsa 66ers, which is owned by the San Antonio Spurs and the Oklahoma City Thunder respectively, continued their single-affiliation partnerships with their parent teams. The Houston Rockets also continued their single-affiliation partnership with the Rio Grande Valley Vipers. The Texas Legends, who is owned by Dallas Mavericks' General Manager Donnie Nelson, also began a single-affiliation partnership with the Mavericks. The other 12 teams were affiliated with at least two NBA teams each. Due to several team changes above and other circumstances, some affiliation changes occurred.

The Dallas Mavericks, who was affiliated with the Albuquerque Thunderbirds for the last two seasons, began a single-affiliation partnership with the Texas Legends.
The Orlando Magic, who was affiliated with the Reno Bighorns in the 2009–10 season, were announced as the new affiliate of the New Mexico Thunderbirds.
The Golden State Warriors, who was affiliated with the Bakersfield Jam for the last four seasons, were announced as the new affiliate of the Reno Bighorns.
The Los Angeles Lakers, who owned and was affiliated with the Los Angeles D-Fenders for the last four seasons, were announced as the new affiliate of the Bakersfield Jam.

Coaching changes

Offseason
On November 5, 2009, the Frisco D-League Team, who later became the Texas Legends, hired Basketball Hall of Famer Nancy Lieberman as the franchise's first head coach. She became the first female to coach a men's professional basketball team.
On June 2, 2010, the Idaho Stampede hired 2007 D-League Most Valuable Player and former Stampede player Randy Livingston as the team's head coach, replacing Bob MacKinnon Jr. who resigned on May 6, 2010.
On July 27, 2010, the New Mexico Thunderbirds promoted assistant coach and former Thunderbirds player Darvin Ham as the team's head coach, replacing John Coffino who resigned in April 2010.
On August 12, 2010, the Reno Bighorns hired former NBA head coach Eric Musselman as the team's head coach, replacing Jay Humphries who left the team after the 2009–10 season.
On September 7, 2010, the Utah Flash promoted assistant coach Kevin Young as the team's head coach, replacing Brad Jones who was later hired as the head coach for the Austin Toros on September 28, 2010.
On September 21, 2010, the Erie BayHawks hired former Irish national team head coach Jay Larranaga as the team's head coach, replacing John Treloar who was hired as the Director of Player Personnel for the Phoenix Suns on September 21, 2010.
On September 28, 2010, the Austin Toros hired former Utah Flash head coach Brad Jones as the team's head coach, replacing Quin Snyder who was hired as the assistant coach for the Philadelphia 76ers on July 1, 2010.

In-season
 On January 14, 2011, the Sioux Falls Skyforce fired head coach Tony Fritz. Assistant coach Duane Ticknor took over as the interim head coach for two games until former Skyforce head coach Morris McHone was hired on January 20, 2011.

Players
An NBA D-League team roster consists of draftees, returning, allocation and tryout players. In addition, NBA teams can assign players who are on their first or second NBA season to their D-League affiliates. The roster must consist of 10 D-League players, but the maximum roster size is 12 players, including NBA assignees. If a team had more than two NBA assignees, the team must reduce its roster to avoid having more than 12 players. In the D-League, all players sign a one-year NBA D-League Standard Player Contract with the league, not with the specific D-League teams.

Returning players are players who played in the league during the previous season and are retained by their respective teams. The D-League teams are allowed to invite a limited number of returning players. Players who signed a D-League contract but are not retained by their previous teams are placed on the draft pool, along with new players who also sign with the league. Tryout players are the players who are invited to join the D-League team from the open tryouts which are held by each teams in October, before the season began.

Beginning this season, the league implements a new allocation players rule. In the past, the teams are awarded allocation players, who are usually players with significant local or player appeal to that market. The allocation rule was replaced to accommodate the new allocation rule which involves the NBA affiliates of the D-League teams. In the new rule, up to three players cut last from the NBA teams roster prior to the draft, will be allocated to their D-League affiliates, if they sign the standard D-League contract. The new rule increased the bond between the NBA teams and their D-League affiliates, while sacrificing the marketing effect from local allocation players.

Returning, allocation and tryout players

On October 30, 2011, the league announces the returning, allocation and tryout players for the 16 teams. Several players with NBA experience who returned to their previous teams are JamesOn Curry, Reece Gaines, Orien Greene, Steven Hill, Chris Hunter, Cedric Jackson, Othyus Jeffers, Dontell Jefferson, Trey Johnson, Renaldo Major, Chris McCray, Courtney Sims and Mario West. D-League All-Stars Walker Russell Jr., Mustafa Shakur and Curtis Stinson were also named on the returning players list. The expansion franchise Texas Legends earlier participated in an expansion draft to acquire the rights to returning players of the Los Angeles D-Fenders, who would not take part in the 2010–11 season. The Legends selected 10 out of the 14 available players and two of them were later named in the returning players list for the Legends.

The list of allocation players from the NBA teams includes several notable players such as former NBA players Thomas Gardner, Stéphane Lasme, Rashad McCants, Sean Williams and Kyle Weaver. McCants and Williams, who were NBA first-round draft picks, were intentionally signed by the Dallas Mavericks towards the end of the training camp period and were waived on the day after, solely for the purpose of allocating them to the Texas Legends. Similar situation occurred with NBA second-round draft pick Tiny Gallon, who was waived by the Boston Celtics only two days after he was signed. Gallon was then allocated to the Maine Red Claws. The returning and allocation players were joined by the tryout players and the draftees for the training camp, where the players would compete for a place on the teams' 12-man roster.

Draft

The tenth annual NBA Development League Draft was held on November 1, 2010. In this draft, all 16 teams took turns selecting eligible players for their roster. Former NBA second-round draft pick, Nick Fazekas, was selected first overall by the Reno Bighorns. Former Charlotte Bobcats player, Alan Anderson was selected second by the New Mexico Thunderbirds. Magnum Rolle, the 51st pick in the 2010 NBA draft was selected third by the Maine Red Claws. Other notable first-round picks are former NBA second-round draft picks Robert Vaden, Cheikh Samb and Salim Stoudamire. In the second round, two former NBA draft picks, Walter Sharpe and Antonio Daniels, were selected. Daniels, who has played 12 seasons in the NBA since he was drafted fourth in the 1997 NBA draft, was selected by the Texas Legends with the 29th pick. A total of 128 players were selected in the eight-round draft.

Assignments

During the 2010–11 season, an all-time high 39 NBA players were assigned to the D-League. Out of the 39 players assigned, 18 are NBA first-round draft picks, 14 are NBA second-round draft picks, and 7 are undrafted players. Hasheem Thabeet, the second overall pick in 2009, was assigned to the Rio Grande Valley Vipers for seven games in March and April. He is the highest drafted NBA player to ever play in the D-League. The sixth pick in the 2009 NBA Draft, Jonny Flynn, was assigned twice and played two games with the Sioux Falls Skyforce. He was assigned to the D-League for the purpose of rehabbing from a hip injury which required a surgery during the off-season. Four other former lottery picks, Terrence Williams, Cole Aldrich, Ed Davis and Patrick Patterson, were also assigned to the D-League. Aldrich, Davis and Patterson are among the ten first-round draft picks from the 2010 NBA draft who were assigned this season. Out of the 27 players selected in the 2010 NBA Draft who played in the D-League this season, 22 of them were NBA assignees.

2009 NBA first-round picks, Rodrigue Beaubois and Terrence Williams, both earned the distinction of being assigned to the D-League for unusual reasons. On November 30, 2010, Beaubois was assigned by the Dallas Mavericks to the Texas Legends even though he was still inactive due to an injury suffered in the off-season and was not expected to return until January. He was recalled in January without playing any game for the Legends as he was still injured during his whole stint with the Legends. At the time of his assignment, the Legends had seven former NBA first-round draft picks on their roster. Mavericks owner Mark Cuban stated that Beaubois was assigned for "marketing support" as the Legends is owned by Donnie Nelson who is also the Mavericks' general manager. On the other hand, Williams was assigned to the Springfield Armor after he was suspended by the New Jersey Nets due to repeated violations of the team's policy. Even though the Nets insists that the assignment is not a demotion, the move initiated an argument that Williams was punished by being demoted to the D-League. He was recalled after playing three games with the Armor, where he averaged a triple-double.

Call-ups

A call-up occurs when a player is signed by an NBA team. An NBA team is allowed to sign any D-League player as long as they are eligible to play in the NBA under the current Collective Bargaining Agreement (CBA). However, an NBA team could not call-up a player whose draft rights are still held by other NBA teams. This rule applies for three Tulsa 66ers players, Ryan Reid, Robert Vaden and Latavious Williams, whose draft rights are still held by the Oklahoma City Thunder, the NBA affiliate of the 66ers. A D-League player is usually signed to a 10-day contracts, a short term contract which lasted ten days and are available to be used starting January 5. A player can only sign two 10-day contracts with the same team in one season. If the team want to retain the player after the second 10-day contract expired, the team has to sign the player for the remainder of the season.

During the season, there were 27 call-ups involving 20 different players. Seven players earned multiple call-ups to more than one NBA team before they finally earned contracts for the remainder of the season. Only three players failed to earn contracts for the remainder of the season. The Rio Grande Valley Vipers and the Tulsa 66ers each had three players called-up. The San Antonio Spurs called-up the most player with four, but only two of them earned contracts for the remainder of the season. The Washington Wizards called-up three players and each of them earned a contract for the remainder of the season.

Out of the 20 players assigned, 10 of them have played in the NBA before they were called-up. NBA veteran Antonio Daniels, who returned to professional basketball after one-year absence, played for the Texas Legends until he was called up to the Philadelphia 76ers in April. Jeff Adrien, who began the season with the Golden State Warriors before he was waived in December, was called up by the Warriors in February. Steve Novak and Mario West, who have played four and three seasons in the NBA respectively, also received call-ups and were signed for the remainder of the season. Other players with NBA experience who were called-up are Othyus Jeffers, Trey Johnson, Danny Green, Orien Greene, Garrett Temple and Kyle Weaver. Six players, Marcus Cousin, Zabian Dowdell, Patrick Ewing Jr., Chris Johnson, Larry Owens and Mustafa Shakur, made their first NBA appearance during the call-ups.

Note
Number in parentheses indicates the number of call-ups a player has received during the season.
Asterisk (*) indicates team affiliation

Regular season

Showcase
The seventh annual NBA D-League Showcase was held at the South Padre Island Convention Centre in South Padre Island, Texas from January 10 until January 13, 2011. The event featured every D-League teams who played two games each over a four-day schedule. The games were attended by the professional scouts from all NBA teams. The event was designed to allow the NBA teams to evaluate the D-League's prospects for future call-ups. After the Showcase, four D-League players, Jeff Adrien, Joe Alexander, Othyus Jeffers and Marcus Landry, along with one NBA player assigned to the D-League, Jeremy Lin, were named to the All-NBA D-League Showcase First Team by a panel of D-League head coaches, NBA scouts and media.

In addition to the 16 games, the league also hosted the inaugural NBA D-League Showcase Three-Point Contest and NBA D-League Showcase Slam Dunk Contest. The Three-Point Contest was won by Texas Legends guard Booker Woodfox, while the Slam Dunk Contest was won by Springfield Armor guard L. D. Williams.

Standings

Eastern Conference

Western Conference

Notes
x indicates a team that has qualified for the playoffs
Number in parentheses indicates the team's seeding for the playoffs.

Statistics leaders

All-Star Weekend

All-Star Game

The fifth annual NBA D-League All-Star Game was held during the 2011 NBA All-Star Weekend in Los Angeles. The game was played in the Los Angeles Convention Center on February 19. The Eastern Conference All-Stars defeated the Western Conference All-Stars 115–108, led by Iowa Energy center Courtney Sims. Sims scored a game-high 25 points and was named as the MVP of the game. This is the second All-Star MVP honors for Sims after being named as the co-MVP in the 2009 All-Star Game.

Dream Factory Friday Night

The fourth annual NBA D-League Dream Factory Friday Night was held on February 18 during the 2011 NBA All-Star Weekend. The events included a slam dunk contest, a three-point shooting contest and a shooting stars competition, all of which are also annual competitions in the NBA All-Star Saturday Night. In the Slam Dunk Contest, the reigning champion Dar Tucker of the New Mexico Thunderbirds retained his title as the D-League Slam Dunk Champion after defeating Dakota Wizards center Chris Johnson in the final round with a score of 96–93. Texas Legends guard Booker Woodfox, who also won the Three-Point Contest during the D-League Showcase in January, won the Three-Point Shooting Contest. The Shooting Stars Competition was won by the team of Shane Edwards (New Mexico Thunderbirds), Orien Greene (Utah Flash) and Jeremy Wise (Bakersfield Jam).

Playoffs
The Eastern and Western Conference winners, along with the next six teams with the best regular season records regardless of conference, qualified for the playoffs. The playoffs consist of three rounds with best-of-three format. Teams with the better regular season record holds home-court advantage in every rounds. The teams were seeded from 1 to 8 based on their regular season records. The top three seeds had to choose their opponents in the first round from among the four lowest seeded teams. The fourth seeded team would be paired with the remaining team that is not chosen as an opponent by the top three seeds. The first seed, Iowa Energy, selected the seventh seed, Utah Flash; the second seed, Reno Bighorns, selected the fifth seed Erie BayHawks; and the third seed, Rio Grande Valley Vipers, selected the sixth seed Bakersfield Jam. The two remaining teams, the fourth seed Tulsa 66ers and the eighth seed Texas Legends, faced each other in the last matchup.

Notes
The numbers to the left of each team indicate the team's seeding.
The numbers to the right indicate the number of games the team won in that round.
The conference champions are marked by an asterisk (*).
Teams in bold advanced to the next round.
Teams in italics have home-court advantage in that round.

First round

(1) Iowa Energy vs. (7) Utah Flash

(2) Reno Bighorns vs. (5) Erie BayHawks

(3) Rio Grande Valley Vipers vs. (6) Bakersfield Jam

(4) Tulsa 66ers vs. (8) Texas Legends

Second round

(1) Iowa Energy vs. (4) Tulsa 66ers

(2) Reno Bighorns vs. (3) Rio Grande Valley Vipers

Finals

(1) Iowa Energy vs. (3) Rio Grande Valley Vipers

Awards and honors

Most Valuable Player: Curtis Stinson (Iowa Energy)
Coach of the Year: Nick Nurse (Iowa Energy)
Rookie of the Year: DeShawn Sims (Maine Red Claws)
Defensive Player of the Year: Chris Johnson (Dakota Wizards)
Impact Player of the Year: Jeff Adrien (Erie BayHawks / Rio Grande Valley Vipers)
Most Improved Player: Dar Tucker (Texas Legends / New Mexico Thunderbirds)
Executive of the Year: Bert Garcia (Rio Grande Valley Vipers)
Sportsmanship Award: Larry Owens (Tulsa 66ers)

All-NBA D-League First Team:
G Trey Johnson (Bakersfield Jam)
G Curtis Stinson (Iowa Energy)
F Ivan Johnson (Erie BayHawks)
F Joe Alexander (Texas Legends)
C Chris Johnson (Dakota Wizards)

All-NBA D-League Second Team:
G Othyus Jeffers (Iowa Energy)
G Orien Greene (Utah Flash)
F Jeff Adrien (Erie BayHawks / Rio Grande Valley Vipers)
F Larry Owens (Tulsa 66ers)
C Marcus Cousin (Austin Toros / Rio Grande Valley Vipers)

All-NBA D-League Third Team:
G Jerel McNeal (Rio Grande Valley Vipers)
G Antonio Daniels (Texas Legends)
F Patrick Ewing Jr. (Reno Bighorns / Sioux Falls Skyforce)
F DeShawn Sims (Maine Red Claws)
C Sean Williams (Texas Legends)

All-Rookie First Team:
G Jerome Dyson (Tulsa 66ers)
G Scottie Reynolds (Springfield Armor)
F DeShawn Sims (Maine Red Claws)
F Marqus Blakely (Iowa Energy)
C Patrick Sullivan (Rio Grande Valley Vipers)

All-Rookie Second Team:
G Elijah Millsap (Tulsa 66ers)
G Jamar Smith (Maine Red Claws)
F Tasmin Mitchell (Erie BayHawks)
F Mouhammad Faye (Rio Grande Valley Vipers)
C Chas McFarland (Springfield Armor)

All-Defensive First Team:
G Orien Greene (Utah Flash)
G Othyus Jeffers (Iowa Energy)
F Tony Gaffney (Utah Flash)
F Larry Owens (Tulsa 66ers)
C Chris Johnson (Dakota Wizards)
C Sean Williams (Texas Legends)

All-Defensive Second Team:
G Cedric Jackson (Erie BayHawks / Idaho Stampede)
G Mario West (Maine Red Claws)
F Ivan Johnson (Erie BayHawks)
F Ronald Dupree (Utah Flash)
C Marcus Cousin (Austin Toros / Rio Grande Valley Vipers)

Player of the Month:
December: Trey Johnson (Bakersfield Jam)
January: Jeff Adrien (Rio Grande Valley Vipers)
February: Ivan Johnson (Erie BayHawks) and Curtis Stinson (Iowa Energy)
March: Curtis Stinson (Iowa Energy)
Performers of the Week:
November 18–21: Courtney Sims (Iowa Energy)
November 22–28: Othyus Jeffers (Iowa Energy)
November 29–December 5: Walker Russell Jr. (Fort Wayne Mad Ants)
December 6–12: Trey Johnson (Bakersfield Jam)
December 13–19: Dar Tucker and Shane Edwards (both New Mexico Thunderbirds)
December 20–26: Oliver Lafayette (Fort Wayne Mad Ants)
December 27–January 2: Othyus Jeffers (Iowa Energy)
January 3–9: Chris Lofton (Iowa Energy) and Jeff Adrien (Rio Grande Valley Vipers)
January 10–16: Marcus Landry and Jeremy Lin (both Reno Bighorns)
January 17–23: Curtis Stinson (Iowa Energy)
January 24–30: Jerome Dyson (Tulsa 66ers)
January 31–February 6: Derrick Byars (Bakersfield Jam)
February 7–13: Ivan Johnson and Blake Ahearn (both Erie BayHawks)
February 21–27: Brandon Costner (Utah Flash) and Jerel McNeal (Rio Grande Valley Vipers)
February 28–March 6: Leo Lyons (Austin Toros)
March 7–13: Tasmin Mitchell (Erie BayHawks) and Patrick Ewing Jr. (Sioux Falls Skyforce)
March 14–20: Curtis Stinson and Marqus Blakely (both Iowa Energy)
March 21–27: Jamine Peterson (New Mexico Thunderbirds)
March 28–April 3: Joe Alexander (Texas Legends)

References
General

Specific

External links
Official site